Oley Township is a township in Berks County, Pennsylvania.  As of the 2010 census, the township had a population of 3,620.  Oley Township was originally formed in 1740 as a part of Philadelphia County, before Berks County was formed in 1752.  The entire township was listed as a historic district by the National Register of Historic Places in 1983. Oley is a Native American name purported to mean "a hollow". Daniel Boone was born in Oley Township November 2, 1734.

Geography
According to the U.S. Census Bureau, the township has a total area of 24.2 square miles (62.7 km), all land. It is drained by the Schuylkill River via its tributaries of the Manatawny Creek and Monocacy Creek. The township's villages include Limekiln (also in Exeter Township), Oley, Oley Furnace, Pleasantville, Spangsville, and Yellow House (also in Amity Township).

Adjacent townships
Rockland Township (north)
Pike Township (northeast)
Earl Township (east)
Amity Township (southeast)
Exeter Township (southwest)
Alsace Township (west)
Ruscombmanor Township (northwest)

Transportation

Numbered highways serving Oley Township include Pennsylvania Route 73, Pennsylvania Route 562 and Pennsylvania Route 662. PA 73 follows an east-west alignment across the northern portion of the township. PA 562 follows Boyertown Pike along an east-west alignment on the southern edge of the township. Finally, PA 662 follows Memorial Highway along a northwest-southeast alignment through the center of the township, including a concurrency with PA 73 in the northwestern part of the township.

Demographics

As of the census of 2000, there were 3,583 people, 1,382 households, and 1,029 families residing in the township.  The population density was 148.1 people per square mile (57.2/km).  There were 1,425 housing units at an average density of 58.9/sq mi (22.7/km).

The racial makeup of the township was 98.66% White, 0.14% African American, 0.03% Native American, 0.28% Asian, 0.20% from other races, and 0.70% from two or more races. Hispanic or Latino of any race were 0.98% of the population.

There were 1,382 households, out of which 33.1% had children under the age of 18 living with them, 62.8% were married couples living together, 7.5% had a female householder with no husband present, and 25.5% were non-families. 19.8% of all households were made up of individuals, and 8.0% had someone living alone who was 65 years of age or older.  The average household size was 2.58 and the average family size was 3.00.

In the township, the population was spread out, with 23.7% under the age of 18, 6.9% from 18 to 24, 30.8% from 25 to 44, 24.4% from 45 to 64, and 14.2% who were 65 years of age or older.  The median age was 39 years. For every 100 females, there were 99.6 males.  For every 100 females age 18 and over, there were 96.8 males.

The median income for a household in the township was $52,151, and the median income for a family was $58,045. Males had a median income of $40,882 versus $27,795 for females. The per capita income for the township was $21,565.  About 0.9% of families and 2.0% of the population were below the poverty line, including none of those under age 18 and 4.8% of those age 65 or over.

Gallery

See also
 Oley Valley
 Oley Valley High School

References

External links

Township website
Map of Oley Township Historic District
Historic American Buildings Survey, Oley vicinity
Historic American Buildings Survey, Pleasantville vicinity

Georgian architecture in Pennsylvania
Pennsylvania placenames of Native American origin
Populated places established in 1740
Townships in Berks County, Pennsylvania
Townships in Pennsylvania
Victorian architecture in Pennsylvania